Syncesia is a genus of lichen-forming fungi in the family Roccellaceae.

Species
Syncesia afromontana  – Africa
Syncesia byssolomoides  – Brazil
Syncesia farinacea 
Syncesia indica  – India
Syncesia madagascariensis  – Africa
Syncesia mascarena  – Réunion
Syncesia myrticola 
Syncesia palmensis 
Syncesia subintegra

References

Roccellaceae
Lichen genera
Taxa described in 1836
Taxa named by Thomas Taylor (botanist)
Arthoniomycetes genera